Schmutz's worm snake (Indotyphlops schmutzi) is a species of snake in the family Typhlopidae. The species is endemic to Indonesia.

Etymology
The specific name, schmutzi, is in honor of Father Erwin Schmutz, who in addition to being a missionary, is also a herpetologist and ornithologist.

Geographic range
I. schmutzi is found in Indonesia on the islands of Flores and Komodo.

Habitat
The preferred natural habitat of I. schmutzi is forest.

Reproduction
I. schmutzi is oviparous.

References

Further reading
Auffenberg W (1980). "The Herpetofauna of Komodo, with Notes on Adjacent Areas". Bull. Florida State Mus., Biol. Sci. 25 (2): 39–156. (Typhlops schmutzi, new species, pp. 114–115, Figure 36).
de Lang R (2011). The Snakes of the Lesser Sunda Islands (Nusa Tenggara), Indonesia: a field-guide to the terrestrial and semi-aquatic snakes with identification key. Frankfurt am Main, Germany: Chimaira / Serpents Tale. 349 pp. .
Hedges SB, Marion AB, Lipp KM, Marin J, Vidal N (2014). "A taxonomic framework for typhlopid snakes from the Caribbean and other regions (Reptilia, Squamata)". Caribbean Herpetology (49): 1-61. (Indotyphlops schmutzi, new combination).

Indotyphlops
Reptiles described in 1980